Sidu may refer to:

People
 Dhanurjaya Sidu, Indian politician
 Majed Abu-Sidu (born 1985), Palestinian football player

Places
 Seyyedan, Khusf, or Sīdu, Iran
 Sidu, Guidong County, a town in Guidong County, Hunan Province, China
 Sidu River, crossed by the Sidu River Bridge, Badong County, Hubei Province, China

Other
 Sidu (TV series), a 2016–2022 Sri Lankan drama series